Copelatus striolatus is a species of diving beetle. It is part of the subfamily Copelatinae in the family Dytiscidae. It was described by Peschet in 1917.

References

striolatus
Beetles described in 1917